Gioacchino Muccin (25 November 1899 – 27 August 1991) was an Italian Roman Catholic clergyman who became the bishop of the Diocese of Belluno-Feltre. He was born in Casarsa della Delizia, Pordenone, a province in the region of Friuli-Venezia Giulia, Italy. From 1949 to 1975, Muccin served as the bishop of the Diocese of Belluno-Feltre. He died at age 91.

See also

Lists of patriarchs, archbishops, and bishops
List of Italians

References

1899 births
1991 deaths
20th-century Italian Roman Catholic bishops
Bishops of Belluno
People from Casarsa della Delizia